The Tinaroo Dam, officially the Tinaroo Falls Dam, is a major ungated concrete gravity dam with a central ogee spillway across the Barron River located on the Atherton Tableland in Far North Queensland, Australia. The dam's purpose includes irrigation for the Mareeba-Dimbulah Irrigation Scheme, water supply, hydroelectricity, and recreation. Completed between 1953 and 1958, the dam creates the impounded reservoir, Lake Tinaroo.

Location and features
In 1952, the Tinaroo Dam and Mareeba-Dimbulah Irrigation Scheme was approved by the Queensland Government.  Construction on the dam was started in 1953 and completed in 1958, at a cost of 12.666 million.  When the dam was filled in 1959, the old township of Kulara near Yungaburra went underwater, and all of the residents relocated to Yungaburra and surrounding towns. The area around Kulara was among the last to flood when the dam filled. Earlier the area of Danbulla, located on Robson's Creek - which also feeds into the lake, went underwater. Most of these residents relocated to the tablelands area as their farms were resumed. The dam is located close to Lake Barrine and Lake Eacham (Yidyam).

The ungated, central ogee spillway is capable of discharging . Two  radial gates serve as irrigation outlets that yield a annually. In addition, one  core valve serves as an outlet for the Barron River.

After the dam was completed in 1958, there was expected to be another few months before the annual rains to do some final earthworks at the base of the dam, and to clear out the final settlements in the area. Unfortunately the rains began earlier than expected and to this day there are still some pieces of large construction equipment under water at the base of the dam wall, because they were not able to be removed in time.

In 2011 the dam's owner, SunWater, completed improvements that included work on both the main dam wall and the saddle dam. The main dam wall was reinforced with the insertion of steel cable anchors within the wall and the addition of a concrete protection slab along the downstream base of the dam wall.

History
James Mulligan was the first European explorer and prospector to visit the tablelands in 1875. The area is now called the Atherton Tablelands after John Atherton who settled at Emerald End Station, at the junction of Emerald Creek and the Barron River.  It is reported through popular legend that upon discovering alluvial tin at the headwaters of the creek, Atherton shouted "Tin, Harroo!!" to his prospecting mate.

Water uses

Irrigation 
Covering almost , the Mareeba-Dimbulah Irrigation Area is spread across the valleys of the Barron, Walsh and Mitchell Rivers. Some  of farmland are irrigated by the lake when it supplies its  of water each year. Areas not serviced by the channels can draw water from streams that have their water replenished by the Barron River, which, in turn, is fed by the lake.

Power generation 
The Tinaroo Hydro Power Station became operational in 1963 and generates , thereby reducing  of carbon dioxide from entering the atmosphere each year.

Urban water supply 
The townships of Tinaroo, Walkamin, Mareeba, Kuranda, Mutchilba, Dimbulah and Yungaburra are supplied from Tinaroo Dam through the Barron River.

In 1952 the Queensland government approved construction at the dam on the Atherton tablelands  in Far North Queensland.  It took six years to build costing them 12 million dollars. The dam supplied so much water  for the 1000 people that worked there. The dam was 44.5 meters tall. The supply level was 670 meters, and the length  of storage was 15 kilometers long. There would have been 100 houses but now there is only 12 because it all has been swept away.

Recreation 

Located on the picturesque Atherton Tableland, with the Tinaroo Range and the Danbulla State Forest surrounding it, Lake Tinaroo provides a popular tourist attraction and recreation facility for over 500,000 people a year.

Water sports 

To this end, the lake is often used for sailing, water skiing, houseboating and swimming. During the drought of the last few years, some of the trees that were flooded during the dam's creation have become a hazard to boats because of the receding waters. Sunwater, the owners of the dam do not cut down trees due to safety hazards. Cutting trees at water level creates less visible submerged stumps as well as underwater obstructions which can float to areas that have been mapped as clear. Illegal tree clearing is reported to Atherton police and Maritime safety Queensland. There are still large areas of flooded vegetation, including trees and other man-made objects such as telephone poles, which stand around in the waters of the Lake. The degree of exposure varying with the water level.

Hiking 
The lake is surrounded by national park, rainforest, pine tree plantations and Australian "bush".  Hiking paths wind in and out of the mountains surrounding the lake and range from a pleasant walk from the parking lot to the water-front, to week-long treks around the lake and its mountains.

Fishing 
Many species of fish and other aquatic animals populate the lake.  The barramundi can grow to an enormous size in the lake because they have no natural predators. Each year, the lake is stocked with young barramundi from the Walkamin Research Station as the species is unable to breed in the lake due to the lack of access to salt water.  Also present in Lake Tinaroo are eel-tailed catfish, sooty grunter, sleepy cod, mouth almighty, archer fish, spangled perch, long tom and many species of crayfish, including the red-claw and yabby.
A Stocked Impoundment Permit is required to fish in the dam.

Tilapia were illegally introduced into Lake Tinaroo and are now well established. They have been declared a noxious pest species and must be destroyed and buried if caught.  It is illegal to possess, rear, sell or buy tilapia. It is also an offence to release tilapia into Queensland waterways or to use them as bait, live or dead.

Statistical overview

References

External links 

Fishing information with lake map at Sweetwater Fishing Lake Tinaroo
Tinaroo Education Centre

Buildings and structures in Far North Queensland
Dams completed in 1958
Dams in Queensland
Gravity dams
1958 establishments in Australia
Tablelands Region